San Cipriano Picentino is a town and comune in the province of Salerno in the Campania region of southern Italy.

Twin towns
 Sormano (Italy, since 2007)

References

External links

Official website

Cities and towns in Campania